Bharuch Junction (station code: BH) is a railway station on the Western Railway network, located in Bharuch, Gujarat, India. It is 'A' category railway station of Western Railway zone of Indian Railways. It serves Bharuch city. It has 6 platforms. Bharuch Junction is well connected to Dahej Port by rail.

It is an important halt for all trains that are bound for Ahmedabad Junction, Jaipur Junction, Mumbai, Amritsar and Delhi.

Lines

The main lines passing through Bharuch Junction are :

 New Delhi–Mumbai main line via Kota Junction
 Ahmedabad–Mumbai main line via Vadodara Junction

Gallery

Trains

Some of the following trains that start from Bharuch Junction are:

 69175/76 Bharuch–Anand MEMU
 69195/96 Bharuch–Dahej MEMU
 69171/72 Bharuch–Surat MEMU
 69149/50 Virar–Bharuch MEMU

References

Railway stations in Bharuch district
Vadodara railway division
Railway junction stations in Gujarat
Transport in Bharuch